Rose Caron (17 November 1857 – 9 April 1930) was a French operatic soprano.

Early life
Caron was born on 17 November 1857 at Monnerville and studied at the Paris Conservatoire, but was not taken on at the Paris Opera; her husband, an accompanist, encouraged her to take lessons from Marie Sasse who helped her to get engagements at the opera in Brussels (having made her concert debut in 1880).

Career

Her first operatic appearance in Brussels was as Alice in Meyerbeer's Robert le Diable, followed by Salomé in Massenet's Hérodiade and Marguerite in Gounod's Faust; noticed by Ernest Reyer, he chose her to create the role of Brunehild in Sigurd in 1884 (and the Paris premiere in 1885). In 1888, she created the role of Laurence in Benjamin Godard's Jocelyn at La Monnaie de Munt in Brussels. The title role in Reyer's Salammbo (1890) was also created by Caron in Brussels.

In 1885 she began singing at the Paris Opera, where she became the chief rival of Lucienne Bréval. Caron was the first in Paris to sing Desdemona in Verdi's Otello. Her repertoire included several Wagnerian roles, including Sieglinde in Die Walküre, as well as Rachel in Halévy's La Juive and Valentine in Meyerbeer's Les Huguenots. At the Opéra-Comique she sang Léonore in Beethoven's Fidelio (in 1898) and the title roles in Gluck's Iphigénie en Tauride and Orphée.

Caron sang in the first performance of Debussy's L'enfant prodigue on 27 July 1884, as part of the composition competition of the Prix de Rome in Paris.

Caron sang a few times with the Société des Concerts du Conservatoire: in December 1885/January 1886, she performed airs from Der Freischütz by Weber and La vestale by Spontini; at the official concert of the Exposition Universelle on 20 June 1889, fragments from Ambroise Thomas's Psyché and excerpts from Reyer's Sigurd; and in March 1895, scenes from Gluck's Alceste.

She also sang Marguerite in the stage premiere of Berlioz's La damnation de Faust at Monte Carlo in 1893.

After 1895, she reduced her public appearances considerably and concentrated on teaching at the Paris Conservatoire (1904–09) and then as a private tutor. One of her pupils was soprano Alice Zeppilli. She left a few recordings dating from 1903 and 1904, for French Fonotipia, that were recorded poorly, and show her past her prime.

Personal life
During her lifetime, Caron was linked with French statesman Théophile Delcassé and the Prime Minister of France Georges Clemenceau.

She died in Paris, aged 72, and was buried at Monnerville Cemetery.

Gallery

References

External links

 

1857 births
1930 deaths
Conservatoire de Paris alumni
French operatic sopranos
Chevaliers of the Légion d'honneur
19th-century French singers